Valerik may refer to:
Valerik River, a river in the Chechen Republic, Russia
Battle of the Valerik River, 1840 battle fought at this river
Valerik (poem), Mikhail Lermontov's poem about this battle
Valerik, Achkhoy-Martanovsky District, a rural locality (a selo) in the Chechen Republic, Russia